Vedašić may refer to:

 Vedašić, Tomislavgrad, a village in Bosnia and Herzegovina
 Vedašić, Udbina, a village in Croatia